Rashtriya Samaj Paksha ("National Society Party") is an Indian political party based in Maharashtra, founded in 2003. Mahadev Jankar was the founder and President of the party. Prabodhankar Govindram Shurnar from Nanded has been working as a social worker for their society since 1994. They met Mahadev Jankar at a program in Mumbai. After that, Mahadev Jankar started work in Marathwada with the cooperation of Govindram Shurnar. Mahadev Jankar was a BSP Candidate of the Lok Sabha election in 1998 from Nanded and received approximately 20,000 votes. Mr. Govindram was responsible person for that election.

In the 2004 Maharashtra Assembly elections, the party fielded 38 candidates and received 144,758 votes, 0.35% of all votes. In the 2004 Lok Sabha elections, the party fielded 12 candidates in Maharashtra and one in the Karnataka state. The party received 146,571 votes, 0.04% of all the votes. In the 2009 Loksabha elections, they fielded 29 candidates in Maharashtra, two in Assam, one in Gujarat, and one in Karnataka, being 23rd in many candidates. They received 190,743 votes in Maharashtra and 201,065 in total. Mahadeo Jankar stood against Sharad Pawar and Subhash Deshmukh in Madha and received 10.76% of the votes.

Maharashtra Assembly Elections, 2009
In the Maharashtra Assembly Elections, Rashtriya Samaj Paksha was part of the Republican Left Democratic Front, popularly known as Ridalos. RSP candidate, Babasaheb Patil won from Ahmedpur.

Lok Sabha Election 2014
Rashtriya Samaj Paksha joined the NDA in January 2019. During the 2014 general election, Rashtriya Samaj Paksha fought with NDA along with its allies BJP, Republican Party of India (Athvale) and Swabhimani Shetkari Saghtana.

Maharashtra Assembly Elections, 2014
In the 2014 Maharashtra Assembly elections, Rashtriya Samaj Paksha was part of the Mahayuti alliance. They fielded six candidates in Maharashtra Assembly Elections, out of which RSP candidate Rahul Kul from Daund won.

Presidents             
S.L.Akkisagar                 
Mahadev Jankar

Notable leaders
 Ratnakar Gutte, MLA-Maharashtra,Maharashtra State President

References

 
2003 establishments in Maharashtra
Political parties established in 2003
Political parties in Maharashtra